Marrakesh Treaty may refer to:

 Moroccan–American Treaty of Friendship or Treaty of Marrakesh, a 1777 inclusion of the US in a list of countries to which Morocco's ports were open
 Marrakesh Agreement, a 1994 treaty establishing the World Trade Organization
 Marrakesh VIP Treaty, a 2013 copyright treaty on rights of users with visual impairments and print disabilities
 Global Compact for Migration, a 2018 non-binding UN agreement on a common approach to international migration, to be adopted at a conference in Marrakesh